Prosopography is an investigation of the common characteristics of a group of people, whose individual biographies may be largely untraceable. Research subjects are analysed by means of a collective study of their lives, in multiple career-line analysis. The discipline is considered to be one of the auxiliary sciences of history.

History
British historian Lawrence Stone (1919–1999) brought the term to general attention in an explanatory article in 1971, although it had been used as early as 1897 with the publication of the Prosopographia Imperii Romani by German scholars. The word is drawn from the figure of prosopopeia in classical rhetoric, introduced by Quintilian, in which an absent or imagined person is figured forth—the "face created" as the Greek suggests—in words, as if present.

Stone noted two uses of prosopography as an historian's tool: first, in uncovering deeper interests and connections beneath the superficial rhetoric of politics, in order to examine the structure of the political machine; and second, in analysing the changing roles in society of particular status groups—holders of offices, members of associations—and assessing social mobility through family origins and social connections of recruits to those offices or memberships. "Invented as a tool of political history," Stone observed, "it is now being increasingly employed by the social historians."

Overview
Prosopographical research has the goal of learning about patterns of relationships and activities through the study of collective biography; it collects and analyses statistically relevant quantities of biographical data about a well-defined group of individuals. The technique is used for studying many pre-modern societies.

The nature of prosopographical research has developed over time. In his 1971 essay, Lawrence Stone discussed an "older" form of prosopography which was principally concerned with well-known social elites, many of whom were already well-known historical figures. Their genealogies were well researched, and social webs and kinship linking could be traced, allowing a prosopography of a "power elite" to emerge. Prominent examples which Stone drew upon were the work of Charles A. Beard and Sir Lewis Namier.

Charles A. Beard's An Economic Interpretation of the Constitution of the United States (1913) offered an explanation of the form and content of the U.S. Constitution by looking at the class background and economic interests of the Founding Fathers. Sir Lewis Namier produced an equally influential study of the 18th-century British House of Commons, and inspired a circle of historians whom Stone light-heartedly termed "Namier Inc." Stone contrasted this older prosopography with what in 1971 was the newer form of quantitative prosopography, which concern was with much wider populations including, particularly, "ordinary people". An example of this kind of work, published slightly later, is Emmanuel Le Roy Ladurie's pioneering work of microhistory, Montaillou (1975), which developed a picture of patterns of kinship and heresy, daily and seasonal routine, in a small Occitan village, the last pocket of Cathars, over a 30-year period from 1294 to 1324.

Stone anticipated that this new form of prosopography would become dominant as part of a growing wave of social science history. But prosopography and other associated forms of social science and quantitative history went into a period of decline during the 1980s. In the 1990s, however, perhaps because of developments in computing, and particularly in database software, prosopography was revived. The "new prosopography" has since become clearly established as an important approach in historical research.

Data in prosopographical research
A certain mass of data is required for prosopographical research. The collection of data underlies the creation of a prosopography and, in contemporary research, this is usually in the form of an electronic database. But data assembly is not the goal of the research; rather, the objective is to understand patterns and relationships by analysing the data. A uniform set of criteria needs to be applied to the group in order to achieve meaningful results. And, as with any historical study, understanding the context of the lives studied is essential.

In the words of prosopographer Katharine Keats-Rohan, "prosopography is about what the analysis of the sum of data about many individuals can tell us about the different types of connection between them, and hence about how they operated within and upon the institutions—social, political, legal, economic, intellectual—of their time".

In this sense prosopography is clearly related to, but distinct from, both biography and genealogy. Whilst biography and prosopography overlap, and prosopography is interested in the details of individuals' lives, a prosopography is more than the plural of biography. A prosopography is not just any collection of biographies. The lives of the research subjects must have enough in common for relationships and connections to be uncovered. Genealogy, as practiced by family historians, has as its goal the reconstruction of familial relationships, and as such, well-conducted genealogical research may form the basis of a prosopography.

See also
Big data
Historiography
Prosopographical network

References

Sources 

 Abbott, Josie M., The Angel in the Office. British Sociological Association, 2009.
 Beech, George, "Prosopography" in Medieval studies: an introduction, ed. James M. Powell, Syracuse University Press, 1992.
 Carney, T. F. "Prosopography: Payoffs and Pitfalls" Phoenix 27.2 (Summer, 1973), pp. 156–179. Assessing results of prosopography applied to Roman Republican history.
 Erben, Michael, "A Preliminary Prosopography of the Victorian Street", Auto/Biography Vol 4, 2/3, 1996.
 Greer, J, "Learning from linked lives: Narrativising the individual and group biographies of the guests at the 25th Jubilee dinner of the British Psychoanalytical Society at The Savoy, London, on 8th March 1939". University of Southampton, unpublished doctoral thesis, 2014.
 

 
 Krummel, Donald W., "Early American Imprint Bibliography and its Stories: An Introductory Course in Bibliographical Civics", Libraries & Culture 40.3 (Summer, 2005), pp. 239–250. .
 Lindgren, M., 'People of Pylos: Prosopographical and Methodological Studies in the Pylos Archives (Boreas). Uppsala (1973)
 Radner, K. (ed.), The Prosopography of the Neo-Assyrian Empire. Helsinki, 1998–2002.

Further reading 
 Broughton, T. R. S. 1972. "Senate and Senators of the Roman Republic: The Prosopographical Approach." In Aufstieg und Niedergang der römischen Welt. Vol. 1.1. Edited by Hildegard Temporini, 250–265. Berlin and New York: de Gruyter.
 Cameron, Averil, ed. 2003. Fifty Years of Prosopography: The Later Roman Empire, Byzantium and Beyond. Proceedings of the British Academy 118. Oxford: Oxford Univ. Press.
 Eck, Werner. 2010. "Prosopography." In The Oxford Handbook of Roman Studies, Edited by Barchiesi, Alessandro and Scheidel, Walter. Oxford Handbooks, 146–159. Oxford; New York: Oxford University Pr.
 Fraser, P. M., and Elaine Matthews, eds. 1987–. A Lexicon of Greek Personal Names. Oxford: Clarendon.
 Svorenčík, Andrej. 2018. "The missing link: Prosopography in the history of economics." History of Political Economy 50.3 (2018): 605-613.

External links 

  – a prosopography portal that includes a short guide, a bibliography, and an international directory of current projects and researchers.
 Eligivs – Anagrafica del personale di zecca – Prosopography of the mint officials .

 
Historiography